Maciej Kreczmer (born 4 April 1981 in Rajcza) is a Polish cross-country skier who has competed since 1999. His best individual finish at the FIS Nordic World Ski Championships was 17th in the sprint event in 2005 while his best overall finish was fifth in the team sprint event (with Janusz Krężelok) in 2007.

Kreczmer's best individual finish at the Winter Olympics was 25th in the sprint event at Vancouver in 2010.

He has two individual career victories at various levels both in sprint (2000, 2005).

References
 

1981 births
Cross-country skiers at the 2006 Winter Olympics
Cross-country skiers at the 2010 Winter Olympics
Cross-country skiers at the 2014 Winter Olympics
Living people
Polish male cross-country skiers
Tour de Ski skiers
Olympic cross-country skiers of Poland
Universiade medalists in cross-country skiing
People from Żywiec County
Sportspeople from Silesian Voivodeship
Universiade gold medalists for Poland
Cross-country skiers at the 2007 Winter Universiade